The Middle Fork Eel River is a major tributary of the Eel River of northwestern California in the United States. It drains a rugged and sparsely populated region of the Yolla Bolly Mountains, part of the California Coast Range, in Trinity and Mendocino Counties. The river provides groundwater recharge and is used for recreation and for industrial, agricultural and municipal water supply by residents.

Course
The Middle Fork Eel River flows almost 70 stream miles. It rises in the Yolla Bolly-Middle Eel Wilderness at the crest of the Coast Range about a mile or so north of Wrights Ridge and west of The Knob, at the confluence of several small unnamed streams. It makes a large bend to the south, then southeast past the confluence with Rattlesnake Creek (on the left) and the boundary between Trinity and Mendocino Counties. Turning south around Taliaferro Ridge at the Beaver Creek confluence, it then runs southwest to where the Black Butte River enters from the left. Williams Creek enters on the right, then the Middle Fork flows south through Round Valley Indian Reservation, passing within a few miles of Covelo before receiving Mill Creek from the right. Hayshed and Elk Creeks both enter from the left as the river rounds a bend to the north. Afterwards, the river's final miles are spent flowing westwards through a gorge to the confluence with the main stem near Dos Rios.

Dam proposal
In 1967, the U.S. Army Corps of Engineers proposed to build an enormous dam just above the confluence of the Eel River and the Middle Fork Eel River at Dos Rios. If built, this dam would have diverted most of the flow of the river into the Central Valley for irrigation purposes. The project was defeated by outcry from local residents and the intervention of then-California governor Ronald Reagan. Reagan remarked, "Enough treaties had already been broken with the Indians".

Ecology
The river provides wildlife habitat for preservation of rare and endangered species including cold freshwater habitat for fish migration and spawning. In a 1965 California Fish and Wildlife Plan, the Middle Fork Eel River watershed supported an annual run of 23,000 Steelhead trout (Oncorhynchus mykiss) in 178 miles of stream habitat. Steelhead surveys were conducted by DFG and USFS from 1966 to 1999. In 1999 they described the Middle Fork summer steelhead run as “The largest remaining wild run of these magnificent fish”. It was noted to be “...probably the only population that has not been touched by a hatchery program, and as such, is most likely the State’s most important summer steelhead population”. Counts from the annual surveys indicated that the Middle Fork summer steelhead population has declined since 1987, to a count of 471 fish in 1999.

See also
North Fork Eel River
South Fork Eel River
List of rivers of California
Yolla Bolly-Middle Eel Wilderness

References

Works cited
Reisner, Marc. Cadillac Desert, revised edition, Penguin USA, (1993), 

Rivers of Trinity County, California
Rivers of Mendocino County, California
Rivers of Northern California
Tributaries of the Eel River (California)
Wild and Scenic Rivers of the United States